PS Slieve Donard was a United Kingdom passenger paddle steamer that in different periods of her history was also called PS Albion and HMS Albyn. Albion is the name she bore the longest and may be the one by which she is better known in England. Slieve Donard was her original name and the one by which she will be best known on the island of Ireland.

J&G Thomson launched Slieve Donard in 1893 for the Belfast and County Down Railway (B&CDR). In 1900 she joined P&A Campbell's White Funnel Fleet of pleasure steamers and was renamed Albion. From 1915 she served with the Royal Navy as HMS  Albyn. She was bombed in 1917 and scrapped in 1921.

Slieve Donard with the B&CDR
J&G Thomson of Clydebank built the ship for the B&CDR for a price of more than £18,000. Thomson's launched her on 20 May 1893 and quickly her fitted out, giving her a capacity for a combined total of 1,065 passengers and crew. The B&CDR named her Slieve Donard after the highest peak in the Mourne Mountains in County Down.

At the same time Thomson built an exact sister ship, for the Glasgow and South Western Railway. Thomson had launched another sister ship for the G&SWR, a few weeks previously. Minerva had detail differences from Glen Rosa and Slieve Donard.

Slieve Donard entered service on 20 June 1893, which was within a week of her arrival on Belfast Lough. Her regular route was between Belfast and Bangor, for which the scheduled journey time was 55 minutes.

On 1 May 1894 the B&CDR introduced a second new steamer, the slightly larger . Between them Donard and Bearnagh made six sailings per day from Belfast to Bangor from Mondays to Saturdays and a similar number back to Belfast. There were five sailings on Sundays, and from Mondays to Saturdays one sailing per day extended beyond Bangor to Donaghadee. On Saturday afternoons other sailings continued from Bangor across Belfast Lough to Larne.

Albion with P&A Campbell
In 1899 the B&CDR sold Slieve Donard for £12,500 to Captain Alexander Campbell, co-founder of the P&A Campbell pleasure steamer company. The Campbells renamed her Albion and her to their "White Funnel Fleet". The Campbells stationed her at Southampton 1900–02, Newport 1903–12 and Brighton 1913–14. On 1 April 1907 she ran aground in the Bristol Channel off Portishead, but with the aid of tugs she was refloated on the next high tide.

Albyn with the Royal Navy
In 1915 the Admiralty requisitioned Albion, renamed her HMS Albyn and had her converted into a minesweeper. With the Royal Navy she was stationed at Dover and in 1917 she was bombed and set on fire by enemy action.

After the First World War Albyn was not refurbished. She was scrapped in 1921 but P&A Campbell had her engines salvaged.

References

Sources

1893 ships
Ships built on the River Clyde
Minesweepers of the Royal Navy
Steamships of the United Kingdom